Lucy Meacham Thruston (March 29, 1862  –  November 27, 1938) was a writer of historical novels set in the Chesapeake Bay region.

Life and career 
She was born Lucy Meacham Kidd on March 29, 1862 in King and Queen County, Virginia, the daughter of John Meacham and Elizabeth Rebecca (Adams) Kidd. She moved to Baltimore, Maryland when she was twelve years old.  She was privately educated in Virginia and graduated Maryland State Normal School in 1880.  She married Julius Thruston on Valentine's Day, 1887.

Her first book was an illustrated collection of poetry called Songs of the Chesapeake (1900). Thruston wrote a serious of popular historical novels set mostly in Maryland and Virginia, in various periods including colonial America, the War of 1812, and the American Civil War.  Her novels were celebratory; she said "I think we should be proud of the dangers they braved and the laws and constitution they handed down to us."  She also wrote stories and historical pieces for newspapers and magazines and lectured on various topics. 

Thruston was a Quaker and worked on behalf of the American Friends Service Committee.  In the late 1920s and early 1930s, she provided a news service that sent hundreds of articles about peace biweekly to about 450 mostly rural  newspapers in the mid-Atlantic region and created a biweekly newsletter, The Trend of World Affairs, sent to about two thousand teachers and clubwomen.

After her husband died in 1920, she lived with her daughter Augusta.  After a fall at her home, she was taken to Maryland General Hospital, where she died of her injuries on November 27, 1938.  Her other daughter, Elizabeth Thruston Leake, married historian James Miller Leake and became an educator at the University of Florida.

Bibliography 

 Songs of the Chesapeake, 1900
Mistress Brent: A Story of Lord Baltimore's Colony in 1638, 1901
 A Girl of Virginia, 1902
 Jack and His Island: A Boy’s Adventures along the Chesapeake in the War of 1812, 1902
 Where the Tide Comes In. 1904
 Called to the Field: A Story of Virginia in the Civil War, 1906
 Jenifer, 1907
 The Heavens of the Unexpected, 1910.

References 

  

Created via preloaddraft
1862 births
1938 deaths
Novelists from Virginia